Iain Ferrier Lindsay OBE (born 9 March 1959) is a former British diplomat who served as Ambassador of the United Kingdom to Hungary and Ambassador of the United Kingdom to Bahrain. Lindsay now serves as advisor to the Economic Development Board of Bahrain (EDB).

Career 
Lindsay joined the Foreign and Commonwealth Office in 1980, spending much of his early career in the Asia-Pacific region. Lindsay served as the British Ambassador to Bahrain between 2011 and 2015.  He was then British Ambassador to Hungary from 2016 to 2020. Lindsay left Hungary in September 2020, and retired from the diplomatic service.

Honours and awards

References 

Living people
1959 births
People from Falkirk
20th-century British diplomats
21st-century British diplomats
Ambassadors of the United Kingdom to Hungary
Ambassadors of the United Kingdom to Bahrain
Commander's Crosses of the Order of Merit of the Republic of Hungary (civil)
Officers of the Order of the British Empire

Alumni of the University of Glasgow